Kerala Blasters is an Indian professional football club based in Kochi, Kerala. The club participates in the Indian Super League, the top tier of Indian football. The club was established on 27 May 2014 and began their first professional season a few months later in October 2014. They play their home matches at the Jawaharlal Nehru Stadium and is one of the most supported football clubs in Asia.

Key
Key to league competitions:

 Indian Super League – Rebranded India's Top Tier Football League, Established In 2014

Key to colours and symbols:

Key to league record:
 Season = The year and article of the season
 Finals = Final position
 P = Games played
 W = Games won
 D = Games drawn
 L = Games lost
 GF = Goals scored
 GA = Goals against
 Pts = Points

Key to cup record:
 En-dash (–) = The Blasters did not participate or cup not held
 R32 = Round of 32
 R16 = Round of 16
 QF = Quarter-finals
 SF = Semi-finals
 RU = Runners-up
 W = Winners

Seasons
The Blasters started to play in the Indian Super League from its inception in 2014. They were one of the eight founding teams of the league. From 2017-18 season onwards, two more teams were added into the league. The Super Cup did not exist for the first three seasons until it was introduced in 2017. In 2020, one more club joined the league. 

In August 2021, the Blasters announced their participation in Durand Cup, which is the oldest existing football tournament in Asia and 3rd oldest existing professional club football tournament in the world.

Correct as the end of the 2021–22 season.

See also 
Kerala Blasters FC
Kerala Blasters FC Reserves and Academy
List of Kerala Blasters FC records and statistics
List of Kerala Blasters FC players
List of Kerala Blasters FC managers
Kerala Blasters FC results by opponent

References

External links 

Kerala Blasters FC seasons
Kerala Blasters FC
Kerala Blasters FC
Seasons